Kaalam is a 1982 Indian Malayalam film, directed by Hemachandran and produced by R. S. Kothandaraman. The film stars Jagathy Sreekumar, Menaka, Jayamalini and Jayaram in the lead roles. The film has musical score by Shankar–Ganesh.

Cast
Jagathy Sreekumar as Gopalan
Menaka as Jaya
Jayamalini as Dancer
Jayaram (old)
K. R. Vijaya as Janaki
Kaduvakulam Antony as Kurup
Meena Menon as Asha
Raveendran (actor) as Rajan
Radhadevvi as Ammini

Soundtrack
The music was composed by Shankar–Ganesh and the lyrics were written by Bichu Thirumala.

References

External links
 

1982 films
1980s Malayalam-language films
Films scored by Shankar–Ganesh